Agnes of Beaujeu (Agnès de Beaujeu; ? – 11 July 1231) was a French noblewoman, the daughter of Guichard IV of Beaujeu and his wife Sybil of Hainaut. Agnes was Countess of Champagne by her marriage to Theobald I of Navarre.

Agnes married in 1223 to Theobald. For Theobald, this was his second marriage. Agnes and Theobald had Blanche of Navarre, Duchess of Brittany

Agnes died 1231, and was buried at Clairvaux.

Ancestry

Notes

References

1200 births
1231 deaths
Countesses of Champagne
13th-century French women
13th-century French people